John Rede (before 1509–1557) was an English politician and royal tutor.

John Rede may also refer to:
John Rede (died 1404), MP for Oxfordshire
John Rede (died 1570), MP for Cricklade

See also
John Read (disambiguation)
John Reade (disambiguation)
John Reed (disambiguation)
John Reid (disambiguation)